The Stoner–Saum Farm is a historic home and farm complex located at Union Bridge, Carroll County, Maryland, United States. The complex consists of a brick house, a frame bank barn, a brick smokehouse, a stone ice house and summer kitchen, a stone wagon shed, and several other frame farm outbuildings. The house is a two-story, five-bay by two-bay structure with a rubble stone foundation.

The Stoner–Saum Farm was listed on the National Register of Historic Places in 1996.

References

External links
, including photo from 1995, at Maryland Historical Trust

Farms on the National Register of Historic Places in Maryland
Houses in Carroll County, Maryland
Houses completed in 1814
Union Bridge, Maryland
National Register of Historic Places in Carroll County, Maryland
1814 establishments in Maryland